The 2023 European Cricket League is a T10 cricket competition organised by the European Cricket Network. It will be the third edition of the European Cricket League and will once again be held at the Cartama Oval in Málaga, Spain.

Background 
It was announced that the tournament would be taking place between February 27 and March 24, with Finals Week starting on March 20. The 30 team format from the previous edition would remain in place, with 30 'National Champions' taking part in 6 groups across 6 weeks, with the winners of the groups joining 2022 winners Pak I Care Badalona in the Finals Week to determine the overall winner.

Participants 
The following teams were invited to take part as champions of their domestic leagues, or an ECN-related 'Super Series'. The draw was made on January 13, 2023. Previous Champions Pak I Care Badalona will participate in the Finals Week only.

Group stage 
The Group Stage is to be played across the first 3 weeks of the tournament, with each group lasting 4 days. Each group kicked off with a single-round robin stage, before entering a knockout, with seedings based on group standings. The Super 3 stage was eliminated, with teams instead advancing into a single knockout stage following the groups

Group A

Round robin

Knockout Stage

Group B

Round robin

Knockout Stage

Group C

Round robin

Stats

Most Runs

Most Wickets

References 

European Cricket League
T10 cricket